The MCKK Premier 7's 2015 is the fifth edition of the annual, invitational Malay College Rugby Premier Sevens, which involved teams from Malaysia premier schools, states champions and international schools. It were scheduled from 28 February till 1 March 2015. The international teams again return to three compare to previous Tournament of five teams. Hong Kong Sports School,  dethroned the defending champion, Scots College with score 31–12 in the tournament first nonlocals final.

Teams
Teams competing in this tournament are the host, Malay College Kuala Kangsar, SM Vocational Arau, Sekolah Menengah Sultan Abdul Halim, Sekolah Menengah Sains Pokok Sena, Sekolah Tuanku Abdul Rahman, Sekolah Menengah Sains Hulu Selangor, Royal Military College, Sekolah Berasrama Penuh Integrasi Gombak, Sekolah Menengah Kebangsaan Taman Kosas, Victoria Institution, Sekolah Menengah Sains Selangor, Sekolah Sultan Alam Shah, Sekolah Dato' Abdul Razak, Kolej Yayasan Saad, Sekolah Sukan Tunku Mahkota Ismail, Sekolah Berasrama Penuh Integrasi Kuantan, Sekolah Menengah Sains Sultan Mahmud, King Edward VII School, Sekolah Menengah Kebangsaan Sultan Yahya Petra 1, Sekolah Menengah Kebangsaan Agama Shaikh Hj Othman Abdul Wahab, Vajiravudh College
(Thailand), Hong Kong Sports School, and Scots College. (New Zealand).

Group stage

Group A

Group B

Group C

Group D

Group E

Group F

Finals

Shield

Bowl

Cup/Plate Quarter Finals
The winner of the quarter finals gain entrance to Cup semi-finals. The defeated at this quarter final gain entrance to Plate semi-finals.
The Cup/Plate Quarter finals were played with sudden death. In the quarterfinals, MCKK All Blacks, ranked third behind Scots College and Hong Kong Sports School at the end of the preliminary round, trailed 7-10 before overcoming a potentially difficult opponent in Sekolah Alam Shah Putrajaya 19–10.
Local powerhouse Tunku Mahkota Ismail Sports School's love affair in this fifth edition of the MCKK Premier Sevens also ended prematurely in the quarterfinals stage. The 2011 and 2012 champions went down 17–14 against a well-oiled attacking machinery of STAR.
This is the second time SSTMI failed to advance beyond the second round after back to back victories in earlier editions. In 2014 SSTMI were humbled 43-0 by Scots College in the semi-finals.

Plate

Cup
Scots College  slammed the brakes on Sekolah Tuanku Abdul Rahman advancement with a 26–12 win in the semi-finals. It was the second time STAR failed to get past Scots College following the 36–14 defeat in last year's Cup final.
Hong Kong Sports School, the eventual winner broke the hearts of hundreds of former MCKK All Blacks rugby enthusiasts and folks in the semi-finals with a clinical performance as they romped home to a 22–0 victory over the 2013 champions.

Sponsors
Premier Sponsors - Telekom Malaysia
Sponsors - Bloomberg TV Malaysia, Ranhill Bhd, Cyberview, Proton, Modenas, KPJ Healthcare Bhd, Carisbook, Supreme Landmobile & Wireless Corporation and SA Kargo Sdn. Bhd.

See also 

 Malay College Rugby Premier Sevens
Malay College Kuala Kangsar

References

2015
2015 rugby sevens competitions
2015 in Asian rugby union
2015 in Malaysian rugby union